Neusatz may refer to:
 Novi Sad, Serbia
 Neusatz District